Neojordensia is a genus of mites in the family Ascidae.

Species
 Neojordensia asetosa Kandil, 1979      
 Neojordensia lativentris Karg, 1982      
 Neojordensia lawrencei (Evans, 1957)      
 Neojordensia levis (Oudemans & Voigts, 1904)

References

Ascidae